The Johann Schimmelpfennig Farmstead is a farm in Benton Township, Carver County, Minnesota listed on the National Register of Historic Places. The log and wood-framed buildings, built between 1856 and 1909, demonstrate the evolution of Minnesota farmsteads during that era.

History 
Johann Schimmelpfennig, his wife Albertina, and his children emigrated to the United States in 1855 or 1856 from Bremen, now part of Germany.   They homesteaded a quarter-section in Benton Township and built a log house in 1856. The original subsistence farm included the house, a barn, and a smaller hog barn, all of log construction. Johann expanded the farmstead in the 1870s by building a wood-frame addition onto the house, which was a common pattern throughout the county as farmers became more prosperous. He also built a detached summer kitchen and a larger barn. Also, as agricultural patterns shifted from subsistence and cash crops to livestock and dairy construction, family members accommodated this shift by building a much larger livestock barn in 1909, also of wood-frame construction.

References

Buildings and structures completed in 1856
Buildings and structures in Carver County, Minnesota
Farms on the National Register of Historic Places in Minnesota